Johnnie Ross Lynn (born December 19, 1956) is an American football coach and former player.  He was a defensive back who played for the New York Jets for seven seasons from 1979 to 1986.  He became a secondary coach after his playing career ended.  He coached for the Tampa Bay Buccaneers from 1994 to 1995, the San Francisco 49ers in 1996, the New York Giants from 1997 to 2003 (where he was defensive coordinator from 2002 to 2003), the Baltimore Ravens from 2004 to 2005, the 49ers again from 2006 to 2010, the Philadelphia Eagles in 2011, the Oakland Raiders from 2012 to 2014, and most recently for the Denver Broncos in 2017.

References

1956 births
Living people
John Muir High School alumni
Players of American football from Los Angeles
American football defensive backs
UCLA Bruins football players
New York Jets players
Tampa Bay Buccaneers coaches
San Francisco 49ers coaches
New York Giants coaches
Baltimore Ravens coaches
Philadelphia Eagles coaches
National Football League defensive coordinators
Coaches of American football from California
Sports coaches from Los Angeles
Ed Block Courage Award recipients